The Grant County Courthouse is an historic 3-story redbrick building located in Medford, Oklahoma. It was built in 1909 in the Classical Revival style. On August 23, 1984, it was added to the National Register of Historic Places.

References

External links
Oklahoma County Courthouses: One Okie's  View: Grant County

County courthouses in Oklahoma
Buildings and structures in Grant County, Oklahoma
Courthouses on the National Register of Historic Places in Oklahoma
National Register of Historic Places in Grant County, Oklahoma